Wehr Covered Bridge is a historic wooden covered bridge located at South Whitehall Township, Lehigh County, Pennsylvania. It is a three span, Burr Truss bridge, constructed in 1841.  It has horizontal siding and gable roof.  It crosses Jordan Creek.

It was listed on the National Register of Historic Places in 1980. After an incident in July 2014 in which a grossly overweight truck crossed the bridge, it was closed for several days for inspection.

Gallery

References

External links 

Covered bridges in Lehigh County, Pennsylvania
Bridges in Lehigh County, Pennsylvania
Bridges completed in 1841
Covered bridges on the National Register of Historic Places in Pennsylvania
Wooden bridges in Pennsylvania
History of Lehigh County, Pennsylvania
Tourist attractions in Lehigh County, Pennsylvania
National Register of Historic Places in Lehigh County, Pennsylvania
Road bridges on the National Register of Historic Places in Pennsylvania
Burr Truss bridges in the United States
1841 establishments in Pennsylvania